Gabriel Dias (born July 11, 1990) is a Brazilian racing driver. In 2010, he competed in the British Formula 3 Championship.

External links
 Official website 
 

1990 births
Living people
Brazilian racing drivers
British Formula Three Championship drivers

T-Sport drivers
Hitech Grand Prix drivers
Fortec Motorsport drivers
Formula Renault Eurocup drivers